Hermann Herbert Maria "Harry" Weiss (b. March 17, 1909 - d. May 16, 1979) was an Austrian ice hockey player. He played as a goaltender for the club Wiener EV and the Austria men's national ice hockey team. He competed at multiple Winter Olympic Games and Ice Hockey World Championships.

Life and career
Weiss was born in 1909.

Weiss competed at the 1926 Ice Hockey European Championship, in ice hockey at the 1928 Winter Olympics, the 1930 Ice Hockey World Championships, the 1931 Ice Hockey World Championships, the 1933 Ice Hockey World Championships, the 1935 Ice Hockey World Championships, and in ice hockey at the 1936 Winter Olympics.

Weiss played in all six games during the 1928 Winter Olympics and 1936 Winter Olympics as a goaltender. He was nominated for the Austrian ice hockey team for the 1924 Winter Olympics that was withdrawn at the last minute. After the 1928 Winter Olympics, Weiss was suspended from the Austrian national ice hockey team for ten months alongside Herbert Klang and Walter Sell. It is unclear what caused this suspension.

Weiss played his last season of ice hockey in 1938-1939, where he joined the Swiss ice hockey team. EHC St. Moritz.

Weiss fled to Great Britain at the start of 1939 after persecution by Nazis in Austria because of his Jewish descent.

References

External links

Olympic ice hockey tournament 1928 

1909 births
1979 deaths
Austrian emigrants to the United Kingdom
Austrian ice hockey goaltenders
Austrian people of Jewish descent
Ice hockey people from Vienna
Ice hockey players at the 1928 Winter Olympics
Ice hockey players at the 1936 Winter Olympics
Olympic ice hockey players of Austria